Mäkynen is a Finnish surname. Notable people with the surname include:

Jukka Mäkynen (born 1961), Finnish politician
Matias Mäkynen (born 1990), Finnish politician

See also
Mäkinen

Finnish-language surnames